Election Day for the 7th National Assembly was July 13, 2014 Slovenian parliamentary elections.

Major events 

 June 22, 2018: First session (convened by President Borut Pahor)
 Matej Tonin (NSi) was elected Speaker with 80 out of 90 votes.

Major legislation

Political parties

Leadership

National Assembly leadership

Leaders of the political groups

Members

Changes in membership

Changes of MPs 
Changes are expected when a new government was formed. MP's who have served as Prime Minister, Minister, State Secretary or Secretary-General of the government, cannot be MP any longer and are replaced with an MP not having previously served in cabinate positions.

Changes in the political groups membership

Working bodies

Committees

Standing Commissions

Other bodies

Sessions

Sessions of the Assembly

Sessions of the working bodies

Appointments and nominations 
National Assembly appoints:

 Speaker and Deputy-Speakers (on the proposal of MPs),
 Prime Minister (on the proposal of the President of the Republic or MPs),
 ministers (on the proposal of the Prime Minister),
 judges of the Constitutional Court (on the proposal of the President of the Republic),
 President and vice-president of the Supreme Court (on the proposal of the Minister of Justice),
 Human Rights Ombudsman (on the proposal of the President of the Republic),
 judges of all regular courts (on the proposal of the Judicial Cuncil),
 Secretary-General of the National Assembly (on the proposal of the Council of the Speaker),
 5 members of the Judicial Council of the Republic of Slovenia (on the proposal of the President of the Republic),
 Governor and Vice-Governors of the Bank of Slovenia (on the proposal of the President of the Republic),
 members of the Court of Audit (on the proposal of the President of the Republic) and
 others, if set by law.

Elections

Composition of the executive 

 President of the Republic: Borut Pahor (SD), since 22 December 2012
 Prime Minister: Miro Cerar (SMC), since 18 September 2014
 12th Government

Interpellations, votes of confidence, and charges before the Constitutional Court

Interpellations 
According to the Article 118 of the Constitution at least 10 MPs can submit and interpellation against a minister or government as a whole.

Votes of confidence 
Prime Minister can, according to the Article 117 of the Constitution request a vote of confidence. If government does not win the vote of confidence, National Assembly has to elect new Prime Minister within 30 days. If it fails, President of the Republic dissolves the National Assembly and snap election takes place within 60 days.

Also, according to the Article 116 of the Constitution, 10 MPs can propose a vote of no confidence and at the same time propose a candidate for the new Prime Minister.

Charges before the Constitutional Court 
Based on Articles 109 and 119 of the Constitution National Assembly can press charges against President of the Republic, Prime Minister or ministers before the Constitutional Court if they brake the Constitution or laws.

Legislative services heads 

 Secretary-General: Uršula Zore Tavčar
 Head of the Secretariat and Deputy Secretary-General: Jerneja Bergoč
 Head of29 the Sector for the activities of the National Assembly: Mojca Marn Čepuran
 Head of the department for preparation of sessions of the National Assembly and working bodies:
 Head of the department for international activity, protocol and translation: Tatjana Pandev
 Head of the Research and documentation sector: Tatjana Krašovec
 Head of the Research department: Igor Zobavnik
 Head of the Documentation and Library Department: Vojka Vuk Dirnbek
 Director and Deputy Secretary-General: Igor Ivančič
 Head of the General sector: Anita Longo
 Head of the Department of Organization and Staff: Sonja Nahtigal
 Head of the Financial department: Rok Tomšič
 Head of the Information sector:
 Head of the Information Systems Development Department: Bojan Verbič
 Head of the department for work with materials and mail: Gordana Černe
 Head of the Department of Operations Service: Jela Jelič
 Head of the department for printing: Iztok Potočnik
 Head of the Operational-technical sector: Alenka Urbančič
 Head of the Investment and Maintenance Department: Janez Gomboc
 Head of the Catering Department: Verica Novaković
 Head of the Department of Transportation: Ivo Paal
 Head of the Department for Reception and Telephones: Anita Knez
 Services of the political groups
 Expert assistance for the political groups
 Head of the Office of the President: Katarina Ratoša
 Head of the Legal Service: Nataša Voršič
 Head of the Public Relations Office: Karmen Uglešič
 Permanent Representative of the National Assembly to the European Parliament: Zvone Bergant

References 

National Assembly (Slovenia)